Andrew Stawicki is a Polish-Canadian photo journalist and media entrepreneur. He began his career in Poland, and he emigrated to Canada in 1982 to join the staff of the Toronto Star. In 1990 he co-founded the non-profit, cooperative photography collective, PhotoSensitive. His most notable work is that of prominent Canadians, including a photograph of Leonard Cohen barefoot in his backyard and a photo of Mordecai Richler that appeared on the cover of Walrus magazine. In 2018, Stawicki was awarded the Meritorious Service Cross
 by the Governor General of Canada for his work with PhotoSensitive.

Publications

Publications with others 
Cohen, David Elliot; Rick Smolan (1984). A Day in the Life of Canada. Collins Publishers. .

Cohen, David Elliot; Rick Smolan (1985). A Day in the Life of Japan. Collins Pub San Francisco. .

Cohen, David Elliot; Rick Smolan (1986). A Day in the Life of America. Collins Pub San Francisco. .

Cohen, David Elliot; Rick Smolan (1987). A Day in the Life of The Soviet Union. Harpercollins. .

Kenna, Kathlee; Andrew Stawicki (1995). A People Apart. HMH Books for Young Readers. .

References

Year of birth missing (living people)
Living people
Canadian photojournalists
Polish emigrants to Canada
Recipients of the Meritorious Service Decoration
Toronto Star people